Sylvan Harold Wittwer (January 17, 1917 – January 20, 2012) was an American agronomist who served as director of the agricultural experiment station at Michigan State University.

Wittwer was born in 1917 in Hurricane, Utah.  He received his bachelor's degree at Utah State University and his doctors degree from the University of Missouri. He was inducted into the Alumni Hall of Honor of the College of Agriculture and Applied Science at Utah State University, 2003.

Wittwer developed a chemical known as Gibberellins.  He wrote Feeding a Billion (1987) and Food, Climate, and Carbon Dioxide: The Global Environment and World Food Production (1995).  Another book he wrote was Greenhouse Tomatoes, Lettuce and Cucumber (1979).

Wittwer served as the first president of the Lansing Michigan Stake of the Church of Jesus Christ of Latter-day Saints (LDS Church) beginning in 1962.  Wittwer had also served as the first bishop of the church's Lansing Ward beginning in 1952.

Wittwer was a member of the board of the Greening Earth Society and the Center for the Study of Carbon Dioxide and Global Change. 
Wittwer authored "Feeding a Billion" in 1987 published by Michigan State University Press with cover design by Lynne Brown.

Wittwer was on the board of directors of Deseret Valley Academy, an anticipated independent LDS liberal arts college.

Notes

References
Giles H. Florence, Jr., "Sylvan Wittwer: Feeding the World’s Hungry", Ensign, March 1990.
Deseret News Church Almanac, 2008 Edition, p. 237.
short biography connected with his papers
Sylvan H. Wittwer's publications

1917 births
American agronomists
20th-century American chemists
American leaders of the Church of Jesus Christ of Latter-day Saints
2012 deaths
Michigan State University faculty
People from Lansing, Michigan
People from Hurricane, Utah
Utah State University alumni
University of Missouri alumni
Latter Day Saints from Utah
Latter Day Saints from Missouri
Latter Day Saints from Michigan
Latter Day Saints from Nevada